Harold Enlow began woodcarving in the 1960s while stationed in Okinawa, Japan. He has become one of America's leading wood carvers.  He is a member of Caricature Carvers of America.

Published works
Carving Figure Caricatures in the Ozark Style, Harold L. Enlow, 1975  
How to Carve Faces In Driftwood, Harold L. Enlow, 1978 
Learn To Carve Faces & Expressions, Harold L. Enlow, 1980 
Let's Carve Wooden Plaques, Harold L. Enlow, 1977 
"Carve Your Own Hillbillkins," Little People of the Ozarks, Harold L. Enlow, 1979
Carving Western Figures, Harold L. Enlow, 1984
How to Carve Folk Figures and a Cigar-store Indian, Harold L. Enlow, 1979 
How to Carve Hobos, Harold L. Enlow, 1989

External links
Enlow at Caricature Carvers of America

American woodcarvers
Living people
Year of birth missing (living people)